Orthogonius clarkei is a species of ground beetle in the subfamily Orthogoniinae. It was described by Murray in 1858.

References

clarkei
Beetles described in 1858